Kathryn Mackel (born 1950) is an American author and a screenwriter for Disney, Fox, and Showtime.

Bibliography
The Hidden
The Surrogate: A Novel
The Departed: A Novel
Outriders: Book One in the Birthright Project
Trackers: Book Two in The Birthright Series
Vanished
A Season of Comebacks
Can of Worms
Alien in a Bottle
From the Horse's Mouth
Eggs in One Basket
Boost

Filmography
Left Behind: The Movie
Disney's Can of Worms
Frank Peretti's Hangman's Curse

References

Living people
1950 births
20th-century American novelists
21st-century American novelists
American women novelists
American women screenwriters
Place of birth missing (living people)
20th-century American women writers
21st-century American women writers